The Colt Lightning Carbine or Colt Lightning Rifle was a slide-action (pump-action) rifle manufactured by Colt from 1884 until 1904 and was originally chambered in .44-40 caliber.  Colt eventually made the Lightning Rifle in three different frame sizes, to accommodate a wide range of cartridges, from .22 Short caliber and .38-40 to .50-95 Express. Its profile resembles the pump-action rimfire rifles made by the Winchester Repeating Arms Company and Remington Arms.  The Lightning saw use as a sporting arm in America and was adopted for use by the San Francisco Police Department, but was never as popular or as reliable as the various lever-action rifles of its day.

Variants
The medium-frame Colt Lightning Magazine Rifle was manufactured between 1884 and 1904. It was the first slide-action rifle offered by Colt. Colt records indicate 89,777 were produced, in .32-20, .38-40, and .44-40 as a companion arm to the Colt Single Action Army revolver.  Two versions were offered: a rifle with a  barrel and 15-round magazine, and a carbine with a  barrel and 12-round magazine. The San Francisco Police Department acquired 401 rifles all of which had  round .44-40 barrels and bore S.F.P 1 through S.F.P 401 stampings on the lower tang.

The small-frame Lightning (also referred to as "Second Model Colt Lightning") was the first rimfire rifle made by Colt and was manufactured between 1887 and 1904 as a plinking and gallery gun. Colt records indicate 89,912 were made, in .22 Short and .22 Long.

The large-frame Lightning (also called the "Express Model") was manufactured between 1887 and 1894. Colt records indicate 6,496 were made in different big game calibers such as .38-56 WCF, .40-60 and .50-95 Express.

Modern versions
Reproduction Lightning rifles are still manufactured today by companies such as Uberti, Taurus, and Pedersoli for hunting, historical reenactment, and competition purposes such as Cowboy Action Shooting in calibers such as .38 Special/.357 Magnum, .44-40, and .45 Colt.  Of these calibers, only the .44-40 was offered in the Lightning when it was originally produced by Colt.

See also
Colt-Burgess rifle

References

External links
 Pedersoli Lightning page

Colt rifles
Rifles of the United States
Pump-action rifles
Guns of the American West
Carbines